Russian Uruguayans are people born in Russia who live in Uruguay or Uruguay-born people of Russian descent. They are a local ethnic minority.

Overview
The most important places in Uruguay with a strong presence of people of Russian descent are:
 San Javier, which has the largest population of persons of Russian descent
 Colonia Ofir, a settlement of Old Believers

There is a small Russian presence in Montevideo, where there can be found the only Russian Orthodox church in Uruguay. 

Also among the Jewish Uruguayan community there are some people of Russian-Jewish descent.

Notable Russian Uruguayans
Vasiliy Semionovitch Lubkov, cleric, spiritual leader of New Israel
Vladimir Roslik, physician, victim of the military dictatorship
José Serebrier, conductor and composer
Alejandro Stock, artist
Volf Roitman, painter, sculptor, and architect

See also
Dutch Uruguayans

References

External links
 
 Russians in Uruguay, Part 1. 18.09.2009 
 Russians in Uruguay, Part 2. 05.10.2009 

Uruguay
Ethnic groups in Uruguay
 
European Uruguayan
Russia–Uruguay relations
Immigration to Uruguay